Dale Frances Bozzio (née Consalvi; born March 2, 1955) is an American rock and pop vocalist. She is best known as co-founder and lead singer of the '80s new wave band Missing Persons and for her work with Frank Zappa. While with Zappa, she performed significant roles in two of his major works, Joe's Garage (1979) and Thing-Fish (1984).  Bozzio has released four solo albums and one EP.

She co-founded Missing Persons in 1980 with former Zappa musicians Warren Cuccurullo and Terry Bozzio (her husband from 1979 to 1986). In addition to being the band's lead vocalist, she also contributed lyrics. Missing Persons released one EP and six albums, including Spring Session M (1982), which achieved gold record status.

After Missing Persons disbanded in 1986, Bozzio was signed to Prince's Paisley Park label which released her first solo album, Riot in English (1988). Bozzio subsequently reformed Missing Persons and continues to perform the band's repertoire at venues across the United States. She has also participated periodically in reunions of the original band and has continued her work as a solo artist. In 2014, Bozzio was signed to Cleopatra Records and released a new studio album titled Missing in Action. During the summer of 2014, she signed with GRA Records for a new album to be produced by Stephan DeReine.

Early life
Bozzio was born Dale Frances Consalvi in Medford, Massachusetts. From the age of 16, she studied drama at Emerson College and worked as a Bunny at the Playboy Club in Boston. She was named Boston Playboy Club Bunny of the Year in 1975.

In 1976, Bozzio traveled to Playboy Mansion West in Los Angeles at the request of Hugh Hefner, to interview for a position as a Valentine party hostess. The opportunity provided for both a continuing relationship with Playboy and for living arrangements in Los Angeles, from which she could pursue an acting career. But Bozzio rejected Hefner's offer and thus failed to secure living arrangements. However, shortly thereafter, she chanced upon musician and composer Frank Zappa, whom she had met previously at one of his concerts in Boston. That encounter led to her employment with Zappa.

Bozzio posed nude for Hustler, being featured in an edition published in February 1985.

With Frank Zappa
Zappa hired Bozzio to voice the part of Mary in his rock opera Joe's Garage (1979) which was under development at the time. In that role she sang about issues such as the Roman Catholic Church, sexuality, and the culture of rock bands. In "Packard Goose", Bozzio, again as the voice of Mary, gave a brief monologue concerning how information, knowledge, wisdom, truth, beauty, love, and music relate to each other, with music as the best.

Bozzio's voice can also be heard in the 1979 film Baby Snakes and in the single "I Don't Wanna Get Drafted" (1980), a criticism of the U.S. military draft policy at that time. "I Don't Wanna Get Drafted" was also included on the album The Lost Episodes (1996).

In 1984, Bozzio was cast in Zappa's musical, Thing-Fish. In voicing the part of Rhonda, she played opposite her real-life husband at the time, Terry Bozzio, who voiced the character Harry, Rhonda's husband. In Thing-Fish, Bozzio articulated some of the album's topics such as feminism, female sexuality, young urban professionals, and the state of Broadway musical theater.

In November 1991, participating along with other alumni in Zappa's fiftieth birthday tribute concert, Zappa's Universe, Dale revised the words in her recitation of her lines in "Packard Goose" to, "Music...and Frank Zappa...are the best."

Missing Persons

Bozzio, along with Zappa touring guitarist Warren Cuccurullo and Terry Bozzio who had been one of Zappa's drummers, founded Missing Persons in 1980. Missing Persons had multiple hits during the first half of the 1980s and disbanded in 1986, shortly after the release of their third album titled Color in Your Life (1986).

Bozzio continued to record and perform after the breakup of the original Missing Persons band. During the early 1990s, she toured with her own group using the band name and performing Missing Persons songs. In June 2005, Missing Persons featuring Dale Bozzio appeared on week five of the NBC show Hit Me Baby One More Time.

Dale and Missing Persons were referenced in season 2 of the CW TV network show iZombie in 2015. A recurring character played by Jessica Harmon is FBI agent Dale Bozzio, who works on missing persons cases.

Solo career
Bozzio's solo album Riot in English was released in 1988 on Prince's Paisley Park Records, under the mononym Dale. The lead single "Simon Simon" reached #33 on the Billboard dance chart.

New Wave Sessions was released on October 9, 2007, on compact disc by Cleopatra Records. The album included new versions of the Missing Persons hits "Words" and "Destination Unknown", and covers of the 1980s songs "Funkytown", "Der Kommissar", "Turning Japanese", "I Know What Boys Like", and "Girls Just Wanna Have Fun".

In 2010, Bozzio's Make Love Not War album and Talk Talk EP was released on Electrik Blue Records.

In 2014, Bozzio's Missing in Action was released on Cleopatra Records.

In 2020, she released her second solo album as Missing Persons titled Dreaming.  It contains mostly covers of some classic rock / pop songs from 1960s, 1970s and 1980s decades.

Influences and influence upon other artists
Bozzio was influenced by black and white film era stars including Jean Harlow and Marlene Dietrich. She was also influenced by Judy Garland, and Frank Zappa. For her work with Missing Persons, Bozzio drew inspiration from the screen images of black and white era actresses; however, she incorporated color into her presentation.

Her influence was behind Gelvin Guitars SSM guitar they made specifically for her with a Spring Session M theme to it.

Personal life
During her work with Zappa, she met drummer Terry Bozzio in 1976. They married in 1979 after Terry had become a member of the band U.K. They divorced in 1986 with Dale retaining her married name. She has two children from her marriage to Richard McKenzie.

Discography

With Frank Zappa
 Joe's Garage, Act I (1979)
 Joe's Garage, Acts II and III (1979)
 Thing-Fish (1984)
 The Lost Episodes (1996)

With Missing Persons 
 Missing Persons EP (1980) No. 46 US
 Spring Session M (1982, 1995) No. 17 US
 Rhyme & Reason (1984, 2000) No. 43 US
 Color in Your Life (1986, 2000) No. 88 US
 The Best of Missing Persons (1987)
 Late Nights Early Days (1998)
 Remixed Hits (1999)
 Lost Tracks (2002)
 Classic Masters: Missing Persons (2002)
 The Best of Missing Persons: 10 Best Series (2002)
 Walking in LA: The dance mixes (2006)
 Live from the Danger Zone!: Dale Bozzio & Missing Persons (March 2008 Acadia Records UK – Europe & Airline Records – USA)
 Missing in Action (2014) 
 Dreaming (2020)

Solo releases
 Riot in English (1988)
 New Wave Sessions (2007)
 Talk Talk EP (2010)
 Make Love Not War (2010)

Filmography and videography

Filmography
 Baby Snakes (1979)
 Lunch Wagon (1981)
 Zappa's Universe (1993)
 US Festival 1983 Days 1-3 (2009)

Videography

Missing Persons
Words (1981)
Mental Hopscotch (1982)
Destination Unknown (1982)
Noticeable One (1983)
Surrender Your Heart (1984)
Give (1984)
Right Now (1984)
I Can't Think About Dancing (1986)

With Frank Sinatra
L.A. is My Lady (1984)

Solo
Simon Simon (1988)

Guest Appearances
"Walking in LA" live with Lunden Reign, Live at LA Pride Festival (June 7, 2014)

References

External links

 Dale Bozzio interview 2014 Rocker Magazine

1955 births
Living people
Paisley Park Records artists
American new wave musicians
Women new wave singers
Missing Persons (band) members
People from Medford, Massachusetts
Singers from Massachusetts
21st-century American women singers
21st-century American singers